Motovylivka may refer to the following places in Ukraine:

Motovylivka, Kyiv Oblast, village in Fastiv Raion
Motovylivka, Zhytomyr Oblast, village in Liubar Raion